Anabel del Carmen Guzmán Rodríguez (born 8 September 1991) is a Venezuelan footballer who plays as a centre back for Chilean club Colo-Colo. She has been a member of the Venezuela women's national team.

International career
Guzmán played for Venezuela at senior level in the 2010 South American Women's Football Championship.

References

1991 births
Living people
Women's association football central defenders
Women's association football midfielders
Venezuelan women's footballers
Footballers from Caracas
Venezuela women's international footballers
Caracas FC players
Colo-Colo (women) footballers
Venezuelan expatriate women's footballers
Venezuelan expatriate sportspeople in Chile
Expatriate women's footballers in Chile